Deer Lodge is a city in and the county seat of Powell County, Montana, United States. The population was 2,938 at the 2020 census.

Description

The city is perhaps best known as the home of the Montana State Prison, a major local employer. The Montana State Hospital in Warm Springs, and former state tuberculosis sanitarium in nearby Galen are the result of the power the western part of the state held over Montana at statehood due to the copper and mineral wealth in that area. Deer Lodge was also once an important railroad town, serving as a division headquarters for the Chicago, Milwaukee, St. Paul and Pacific Railroad ("the Milwaukee Road") before the railroad's local abandonment in 1980.

The former prison site, at the south end of Deer Lodge's Main Street, is now the Old Prison Museum. In addition to a former cellblock building, the museum complex includes a theater, antique and automobile museums, and a former Milwaukee Road "Little Joe" electric locomotive.

Deer Lodge is also the location of Grant-Kohrs Ranch National Historic Site, dedicated to the interpretation of the frontier cattle ranching era. This site was the home of Conrad Kohrs, one of the famous "Cattle Kings" of Montana whose land holdings once stretched over a million acres (4,000 km2) of Montana, Wyoming, and Alberta, Canada. The Grant-Kohrs ranch was built in 1862 by Johnny Grant, a Scottish/French/Metis fur-trader and trapper who encouraged his people to settle in Deer Lodge because of its pleasant climate and large areas of bunch grass prairie, ideal for raising cattle and horses. The city's name derives from a geological formation known as Warm Springs Mound which contained natural saline that made for a natural salt lick for the local deer population, the protected valley in which Deer Lodge is located was where most of the local wildlife would winter as the temperatures lowered in the high country.

Deer Lodge was the site of the College of Montana, the first institution of higher learning in the state.

History
Extant mentions of the Deer Lodge Valley prior to 1860 are found as occasional remarks in records written for other purposes. Consistent record-keeping begins with the writings of Granville Stuart and others in the early 1860s. 1860 marks the beginning of permanent occupation of both the valley and the future site of the city of Deer Lodge by European-Americans.

Fur trade era
Before 1860,  the Deer Lodge Valley was not the territory of any American Indian group. Gatherings were held there, including horse races. American Indian groups from the west, Flatheads, Pend d'Oreilles et al. passed through the valley as an alternative route to and from the buffalo hunting grounds to the east.

The first documented visit to this area by European-American explorers occurred in 1805–1806, when Lewis and Clark's Corps of Discovery expedition passed by the Deer Lodge Valley without entering it. Evidence of earlier incursion, probably by Spaniards, was noted by miner James B. Beattle on Sugar Loaf mountain in the Race Track mining district on the west side of the Deer Lodge Valley.

Early European trapper/traders passing through the valley referred to it as "the Deer House Plains". The Clark Fork river was called the Arrow Stone river in the 1830s. By the 1850s it was called the Deer Lodge Creek/Hellgate River. Catholic Father Pierre-Jean De Smet brought the first wagons known to have passed through the valley, in 1841.

In 1846, the Deer Lodge Valley became part of the United States and Oregon Territory with the signing of the Oregon Treaty by the U. S. and Great Britain. From 1853 to 1863 it was in Washington Territory, then briefly part of Idaho Territory until the creation of Montana Territory in 1864.

European-American settlement of the valley gained momentum during the 1850s and 60's, with the primary site being at present-day Deer Lodge. During the 1850s, trapper/traders from Fort Hall began wintering herds of horses and cattle in the valley. Also during that decade placer gold finds were made near present-day Gold Creek, first in 1852 by Francois (Bennetsee) Findley, followed in 1856 by Hereford, Saunders, Madison et al., and in 1858–61 by James and Granville Stuart, Reese Anderson et al. In 1860–62, Lt. John Mullan oversaw construction of the Mullan Road, which connected Walla Walla, Washington Territory with Fort Benton, then in Dakota Territory. The Mullan Road passed through the north end of the Deer Lodge Valley.

European-American settlement, Montana gold rush

John Francis (Johnny) Grant built the first permanent structures in the valley in 1859–60, at Grantsville near present-day Garrison. Grant had begun grazing cattle and horse herds in the north valley several years previously and "wintered over" there in 1857–58. In 1860, feeling as he said "lonely", he returned to Fort Hall for summer trading and induced several fellow trader/trappers and their families to return to the valley with him at the end of the season. Instead of locating at Grantsville, his friends chose to build at the site of present-day Deer Lodge, where several Mexican trapper/traders and their Metis  families had already established the seasonal settlement of Spanish Fork. While Johnny Grant had been at Fort Hall, several people had come from Fort Union down the Mullan Road route and begun building homes at Grantsville.

In 1861, the Stuart brothers and Reese Anderson established American Fork near present-day Gold Creek. Also in that year Johnny Grant moved his large family to his newly built house at Deer Lodge, at the present-day site of Grant-Kohrs Ranch National Historic Site. During the next two years, placer gold discoveries at Grasshopper Creek, Alder Gulch and other locations to the south caused a population decline in the valley, including the abandoning of Grantsville and American Fork. Beginning in 1864 with gold strikes to the north, Deer Lodge City grew rapidly as a base for supplies to mines in the surrounding mountains.

Montana Territory
By 1861–1862, Spanish Fork was more often referred to as Cottonwood. In 1862, a Deer Lodge Town Committee was established to lay out the town site, to be called LaBarge City, after Missouri River steamboat Captain Joseph LaBarge whose firm, LaBarge, Harkness & Company, had proposed to start a business in Cottonwood.   Creation of Idaho Territory in 1863 induced a name change to Idaho City. And with the 1864 designation of Montana Territory, Deer Lodge City became the choice. Montana's first territorial legislature defined most of the boundaries of Deer Lodge County, establishing the county seat at the placer mining camp of Silver Bow City, near Butte. In September 1865, county voters transferred the seat to Deer Lodge City.

During the first half of the 1860s, Granville Stuart described valley social life as including many gay dances and parties, which was the way of the Metis. By 1866, Johnny Grant and many of his fellow Metis had become disenchanted with their increasingly numerous neighbors from "the States". In that year, Grant sold most of his Deer Lodge Valley holdings to Conrad Kohrs and in 1867 led a mass exodus of Metis families to the Red River country of Manitoba, Canada.

In 1869, the Territorial Prison was located at Deer Lodge. Also that year, the town site plat for Deer Lodge City was recorded. In 1878, Montana Collegiate Institute was established at Deer Lodge City. It opened for classes in 1883 and closed in 1914.

Attorney Horace Clagett, of the Deer Lodge firm Clagett and Dixon, was elected U.S. Representative from Montana Territory for the 1871–73 term. He was defeated for reelection by Martin Maginnis. Clagett was noted for introducing the legislation establishing Yellowstone National Park. Clagett's partner, William W. Dixon, later moved to Butte and upset Thomas H. Carter in 1891 to serve a single term as U.S. Representative from the State of Montana.

Clagett and Dixon platted the first addition to Deer Lodge City, in 1872. Perhaps its most prominent building was the former St. Joseph's Hospital.

State of Montana, Powell County
Deer Lodge City was incorporated in 1888, with a mayor and aldermen as officers. Montana achieved statehood in 1889 and a battle ensued between Helena and Anaconda over the location of the capitol in which Helena finally triumphed in 1894. In 1896, Anaconda took the Deer Lodge County seat away from Deer Lodge. This began a battle which culminated in the creation of Powell County in 1901, with its county seat at Deer Lodge.

Frank Conley

After statehood, the State of Montana let a contract to run Montana State Prison, which was awarded to Frank Conley and Thomas McTague. They held the contract until 1908. In that year, the State took over running Montana State Prison, appointing Frank Conley as warden. Conley remained in that capacity until 1921, when Governor Joseph M. Dixon replaced Conley with M. W. Potter. The Governor then commissioned an investigation of Conley's administration. This resulted in the MacDonald Report, which would be used as the basis for a civil lawsuit by the State of Montana against Conley. The year following, Montana Attorney General Wellington Rankin sued Conley for misuse of state funds and materials, in the case State of Montana vs Frank Conley The case took three months to try and resulted in the State of Montana being ordered to reimburse Conley. Deer Lodge City celebrated with a victory party.

Frank Conley was elected the fifth (1892–93), seventh (1895–1903) and tenth (1907–1928) mayor of Deer Lodge City. When he resigned for the last time, an article in the Billings Gazette called him 'the longest serving mayor in American history'. Mayor Conley was instrumental in bringing the division headquarters and shops of the Milwaukee Road to Deer Lodge City in 1910. Over the next decade, he presided over upbuilding the town's infrastructure to accommodate the rapidly expanding population. He was also responsible for the building of the City Hall.

Montana State Prison
In 1908, inmates W. A. Hayes and George Rock killed guard John Robinson and seriously wounded Warden Conley in an attempted prison breakout. In 1959, a prolonged riot occurred at the prison, led by Jerry Miles and Lee Smart, which resulted in the slaying of Deputy Warden Ted Rothe and the eventual suicides of Miles and Smart. All inmates were moved in 1977–79 to a new state prison facility outside of Deer Lodge. The town of Deer Lodge employs the Powell County Museum & Arts Foundation to manage the old facility as a museum.

Superfund site
In the 1870s, Butte developed into a rich silver mining camp. Marcus Daly's discovery of rich copper veins in his Anaconda mine launched the Copper Kings era at Butte. In 1883, Daly established his smelter facilities at newly platted Anaconda, Montana. Anaconda immediately became Deer Lodge County's major population center and employer. Smelting activities at Butte and Anaconda left behind enormous amounts of toxic wastes. Flooding on Silver Bow Creek and Warm Springs Creek, particularly in the great valley flood of 1908, spread toxic wastes from Butte through Deer Lodge City, to the Milltown Dam, just east of Missoula. As a result of legal actions begun in 1983 and culminating in 2008, the course of the Clark Fork River from Anaconda to the Milltown Dam was declared to be a Superfund cleanup site. Cleanup costs are financed from the settlement with ARCO (now BP-ARCO).

Economic decline
Interstate 90 bypassed Deer Lodge in 1960. In 1961, the Milwaukee Road ended its Olympian Hiawatha passenger trains. Limited passenger service between Minneapolis and Deer Lodge continued until 1964, at which time all Milwaukee Road passenger service to Deer Lodge ended.

In the 1970s, the Anaconda Copper Company suffered financial setbacks which ultimately caused its 1977 merger with ARCO. By 1982, ARCO had closed down the smelter at Anaconda and stopped mining copper at Butte. In 1980, the Milwaukee Road shut down its western extension. All of its infrastructure from Seattle, Washington to Miles City, Montana was torn out, including the rails themselves.

Geography

Deer Lodge is located at  (46.396183, -112.732922).

Climate
This climatic region is typified by large seasonal temperature differences, with warm to hot summers and cold—sometimes severely cold—winters.  According to the Köppen Climate Classification system, Deer Lodge has an alpine influenced, cold semi-arid climate (abbreviated BSk).

Demographics

As of the census of 2020, the city of Deer Lodge had lost more than one third of its peak census population of 1960.

2010 census
As of the census of 2010, there were 3,111 people, 1,386 households, and 847 families residing in the city. The racial makeup of the city was 96.8% White, 0.6% African American, 0.8% Native American, 0.6% Asian, and 1.1% from two or more races. Hispanic or Latino of any race were 1.2% of the population.

There were 1,386 households, of which 27.9% had children under the age of 18 living with them, 43.9% were married couples living together, 12.2% had a female householder with no husband present, 5.0% had a male householder with no wife present, and 38.9% were non-families. 35.1% of all households were made up of individuals, and 15.6% had someone living alone who was 65 years of age or older. The average household size was 2.19 and the average family size was 2.79.

The median age in the city was 45.7 years. 22.3% of residents were under the age of 18; 6.3% were between the ages of 18 and 24; 20.3% were from 25 to 44; 30.4% were from 45 to 64; and 20.8% were 65 years of age or older. The gender makeup of the city was 49.7% male and 50.3% female.

2000 census
As of the census of 2000, there were 3,421 people, 1,442 households, and 911 families residing in the city. The population density was 2,369.3 people per square mile (917.3/km2). There were 1,593 housing units at an average density of 1,103.3 per square mile (427.1/km2). The racial makeup of the city was 95.67% White, 0.03% African American, 1.02% Native American, 0.61% Asian, 0.61% from other races, and 2.05% from two or more races. Hispanic or Latino of any race were 1.84% of the population.

There were 1,442 households, out of which 29.3% had children under the age of 18 living with them, 49.7% were married couples living together, 9.2% had a female householder with no husband present, and 36.8% were non-families. 32.1% of all households were made up of individuals, and 15.7% had someone living alone who was 65 years of age or older. The average household size was 2.32 and the average family size was 2.93.

In the city, the population was spread out, with 25.3% under the age of 18, 6.7% from 18 to 24, 25.1% from 25 to 44, 23.6% from 45 to 64, and 19.3% who were 65 years of age or older. The median age was 41 years. For every 100 females there were 93.1 males. For every 100 females age 18 and over, there were 88.2 males.

The median income for a household in the city was $29,859, and the median income for a family was $36,108. Males had a median income of $27,903 versus $20,227 for females. The per capita income for the city was $14,883. About 8.7% of families and 10.9% of the population were below the poverty line, including 13.3% of those under age 18 and 5.4% of those age 65 or over.

Media
The Silver State Post is Powell County's only newspaper. KQRV (96.9 FM) is a local radio station licensed in Deer Lodge.

Government and infrastructure
The United States Postal Service operates the Deer Lodge Post Office.

The Montana Department of Corrections operates the current Montana State Prison facility in a nearby unincorporated area in Powell County, near Deer Lodge.

Deer Lodge-City-County Airport is a public use airport located 2 miles west of town.

Education
Deer Lodge Schools educates students from kindergarten through 12th grade. High school education in Powell County is served by Powell County High School located in Deer Lodge. In recent years the school has had an enrollment of about 300 students. The school currently competes athletically in the 6B conference with Superior, Missoula Loyola, Valley Christian, Darby and Florence. Although being in existence since 1903 the school won its first athletic team state championship in golf in 2005. The team name is the Wardens.

The William K. Kohrs Memorial Library, built in Deer Lodge in 1902, is "the only dedicated public library in Powell County." The Kohrs library is modeled after the Carnegie Libraries. "It was built "for $30,000 by pioneer cattle baron Conrad Kohrs and his wife Augusta as a memorial to their son." , the library was struggling financially, and was operating without a library director.

Film credits

Deer Lodge has been a filming location for a number of movies including:

 Rancho Deluxe (1975)
 Heaven's Gate (1980)
 Fast-Walking (1982)
 Runaway Train (1985)
 Diggstown (1992)
 F.T.W. (1994)
 Love Comes to the Executioner (2006)
 Iron Ridge (2008)

UFO documentary
In a 2004 documentary titled The Secret of Redgate by Lynda J. Cowen and Jim Marrs, a number of Deer Lodge residents explain about their experiences with extraterrestrial beings and the rumours surrounding these events. These occurrences which date back some fifty years took place at a location named Redgate on the eastside of Deer Lodge. Many of the locals have had their fair share of bad experiences with "redgate". Henry Huber had this to say about the subject: "one time I drove a girl up there and after parking she touched my left leg, I came instantly just from the touch, I believe an alien possessed me and made me do it."

Notable people
The following individuals are either notable current or former residents of Deer Lodge.

 Mary Stuart Abbott, daughter of Granville Stuart and Aubony Stuart, wife of (E. C.) Teddy Blue Abbott
 John Bozeman, founder of Bozeman, Montana
 William H. Clagett, lawyer, U.S. Representative from Montana Territory in 1871–1873, introduced legislation to establish Yellowstone National Park, law partner of William W. Dixon, friend of Mark Twain (Samuel Clemens)
 William Andrews Clark, United States Senator from Montana – 1901–07, Copper King at Butte, Montana, became one of America's richest people, partner in Donnell, Clark and Larabie Bank at Deer Lodge, Montana in the 1870s, father of Huguette Clark
 Frank Conley, warden of Montana State Prison 1890–1921, mayor of Deer Lodge, Montana 1892–93, 1895–1903, 1907–1928, chairman of Montana Highway Commission 1919–1921, provost marshal of Butte, Montana, in 1914, defendant in State of Montana vs Frank Conley in 1922
 Father Pierre-Jean De Smet, first wagons known to have traversed Deer Lodge Valley in 1841, established St. Mary's Mission in the Bitterroot Valley, performed American Indian baptisms at Warm Springs thermal mound in Deer Lodge Valley in 1840s, drew early maps including the Deer Lodge Valley
 William W. Dixon, lawyer, U.S. Representative from State of Montana in 1891–1893, law partner of William H. Clagett; final author of Montana's 'Alien Law' of 1872 (overturned by Territorial Supreme Court in 1874)
 Eric Funk, Composer and professor at Montana State University
 Kevin S. Giles, newspaper journalist and author of One Woman Against War: The Jeannette Rankin Story (2016), Summer of the Black Chevy (2015), Jerry's Riot: The True Story of Montana's 1959 Prison Disturbance (2005) and Flight of the Dove: The Story of Jeannette Rankin (1980)
 John Francis Grant, built first permanent house in Deer Lodge Valley, co-founder of Deer Lodge, Montana, livestock trader on Emigrant Trail near Fort Hall, cattle rancher, leader of 1867 exodus from Deer Lodge Valley to the Red River country of Manitoba, Canada, participant in first Riel Rebellion
 Phil Jackson, NBA player, coach, 13-time NBA champion; born in Deer Lodge
 Conrad Kohrs, cattle rancher, co-founder of Deer Lodge, "Montana's Cattle King", brother of Henry Kohrs (founder of Kohrs Packing Co. of Davenport, Iowa)
 Elizabeth Lochrie, born and raised in Deer Lodge. Famous artist, muralist, and lecturer, in Montana and nation-wide. Painter of 'the fading frontier'. Cartoonist for Deer Lodge newspaper Silver State Post. Inducted into Piegan Blackfeet tribe as Netchitaki (Lone Woman).
 James H. Mills, pioneer Montana newspaperman,  publisher of the Montana Post at Virginia City, Montana from 1866 until 1869 and The New Northwest at Deer Lodge City from 1869 until 1897, "The Father of Montana Journalism", Secretary of the Territory of Montana 1877–82 under President Hayes
 John Mullan, military rank of captain, surveyor of possible transcontinental railroad routes in what is now Montana in 1850s, oversaw building of the Mullan Road linking Walla Walla, Washington and Fort Benton in 1860–62
 Jean Parker, actress, known for such films as Little Women, The Navy Way and The Gunfighter; born Lois Mae Green in Deer Lodge
 Edgar Samuel Paxson, frontier artist
 Jean'ne Shreeve, chemist
 Aubony (Tookanka) Stuart, Shoshone, wife of Granville Stuart
 Granville Stuart, co-founder of Deer Lodge, Montana, co-discoverer of gold at Gold Creek, Montana, co-owner of DHS Ranch, leader of vigilante group Stuart's Stranglers in 1880s, author of "Forty Years on the Frontier", "Mr. Montana"
 Tendoy, Lemhi Shoshone leading chief, brother-in-law of Johnny Grant 
 Patricia Nell Warren, writer, great-granddaughter of Conrad Kohrs

See also

 List of municipalities in Montana

References
Notes

Citations

External links

 Grant-Kohrs Ranch National Historic Site
 Montana State Prison
 Clark Fork Watershed Education Program
 Old Montana Prison Museums
 Powell County Chamber of Commerce

Cities in Powell County, Montana
County seats in Montana
1860 establishments in Washington Territory
Populated places established in 1860
Cities in Montana